Gabriel Zada (born December 14, 1978) is Professor of Neurological Surgery at the University of Southern California. He is known for his expertise in brain tumor and pituitary tumor surgery and as an innovator in minimally invasive cranial surgery. Zada is the director of the USC Brain Tumor Center, USC Endoscopic Skull Base Surgery Program and USC Radiosurgery Center. He is also an NIH-funded principal investigator at the Zilkha Neurogenetic Institute. He specializes in endoscopic and minimally invasive neurosurgical techniques. During his career, he has published over 200 peer-reviewed articles on various neurosurgical topics, and holds numerous U.S. patents pertaining to minimally invasive neurosurgery and surgical devices.

Early life and education 
Zada graduated from Van Nuys High School in 1996. He then went to the University of California Berkeley to pursue a bachelor's degree in Molecular and Cell Biology with Emphasis in Neurobiology. After his graduation in 2000, Zada went to the University of California San Francisco, completing his MD in 2004. and did his Post-Graduate Training and fellowships at LAC + USC Medical Center, followed by a fellowship in Skull Base and Pituitary Surgery at Harvard Medical School (Brigham and Women's Hospital) and Università Degli Studi di Napoli Federico II in Naples, Italy. In 2015, he earned a Master's Degree in Clinical and Biomedical Investigation from the University of Southern California, and received his board certification from the American Board of Neurological Surgeons.

Career 
Zada joined the Keck School of Medicine of USC as an assistant professor in 2011. As of 2021, he is a Professor of Neurosurgery, Otolaryngology, and Internal Medicine at USC. He is a faculty member at the Zilkha Neurogenetic Institute of USC and Associate Residency Program Director at USC Neurosurgery Residency Program.

Zada is a Fellow of the American College of Surgeons.

Books

Selected publications 
 Endonasal transsphenoidal approach to treat pituitary adenomas and other sellar lesions: an assessment of efficacy, safety, and patient impressions of the surgery, published in 2003 
 Changes in transcranial motor evoked potentials during intramedullary spinal cord tumor resection correlate with postoperative motor function, published in 2005 
 Intraoperative neurophysiological monitoring during spine surgery: a review, published in 2009 According to Google Scholar, 
 The neurosurgical anatomy of the sphenoid sinus and sellar floor in endoscopic transsphenoidal surgery, published in 2011.

Awards and recognition 

 2009 Dandy Fellowship Award Congress of Neurological Surgeons (CNS), New Orleans, LA
 2009 Integra Foundation Award for Brain Tumor Research, Congress of Neurological Surgeons (CNS), New Orleans, LA
 2010 Mahaley Brain Tumor Research Award, American Association of Neurological Surgeons (AANS), Philadelphia, PA
 2015 Byron Cone Pevehouse Research Award, American Association of Neurological Surgeons (AANS), Washington, DC
 2017 Integra Foundation Award for Brain Tumor Research, Congress of Neurological Surgeons (CNS), Boston, MA

References

American neurosurgeons
University of California, Berkeley alumni
University of California, San Francisco alumni
University of Southern California faculty
1978 births
Living people